The following is a list of African-American United States presidential and vice presidential nominees and candidates for nomination. Nominees are candidates nominated or otherwise selected by political parties for particular offices. Listed are those African-Americans who achieved ballot access for the national election in at least one state. They may have won the nomination of one of the US political parties (either one of the major parties, or one of the third parties), or made the ballot as an independent, and in either case must have votes in the election to qualify for this list. Exception is made for candidates whose parties lost ballot status for additional runs. 

Not included in the first and second sections are African-Americans who ran unsuccessful campaigns in nominating conventions or primary elections for their party's nomination (or who have not yet completed that process), write-in candidates, potential candidates (suggested by media, objects of draft movements, etc.), or fictional candidates. The third section includes African-Americans who ran for their party's presidential nomination but who were not nominated, as well as those who are currently pursuing their party's presidential nomination (when applicable).

There have been two African Americans on major party tickets in U.S. history: Democratic presidential nominee Barack Obama in 2008 and 2012 and Democratic vice presidential nominee Kamala Harris in 2020.
 
Barack Obama was the first African American and first biracial president of the United States, being elected in the 2008 election and re-elected in the 2012 election.

Kamala Harris became the first Asian American vice president of the United States of America, being elected in the 2020 election alongside President Joe Biden. She is also the first Indian American vice president and the first female vice president. 

In popular culture, there are African-American presidents of the United States in novels, television shows, films and other media.

U.S. presidential candidates: party nominees
 Denotes winning candidate.

Candidates receiving electoral votes

Candidates receiving popular votes

U.S. vice presidential candidates: party nominees
 Denotes winning candidate.

Candidates receiving electoral votes
Until the 2020 presidential election, no African-American candidates had received electoral votes for vice president.

Candidates receiving popular votes

U.S. president: other candidates for party nomination
Candidates who failed to receive their party's nomination (or who are currently campaigning for their party's nomination). Candidates who won the nomination belong in the above tables only.

U.S. vice president: other candidates for party nomination

See also
African-American candidates for President of the United States
List of female United States presidential and vice presidential candidates
Jesse Jackson 1984 presidential campaign
Jesse Jackson 1988 presidential campaign

Notes

References
 Sears, Thomas James (2001). Rebels, Rubyfruit, and Rhinestones: Queering Space in the Stonewall South. Rutgers University Press. .

 
 
Lists of African-American people
African-American candidates